Ali Niakani (born 1951) is a retired Iranian association football striker. He spent his entire career with Malavan F.C., winning the 1975–76 Hazfi Cup with them. He also played three matches for the national team at the 1974 RCD Cup.

References

1951 births
Living people
Iranian footballers
Association football forwards
Iran international footballers
People from Bandar-e Anzali
Sportspeople from Gilan province